is a city in Miyazaki Prefecture, Japan. The city was founded on January 1, 1950. As of June 1, 2019, the city has an estimated population of 51,241 and a population density of 95.6 persons per km2. The total area is 536.11 km2.

History
Nichinan began as part of the Fujiwara Shōen in the Heian period. The city's history and development were heavily influenced by the history of Obi town, a district of Nichinan which still exists today. Obi was one of the eight districts of Hyūga, an old province in eastern Japan, which was ruled by the Itō clan based at Obi Castle.

Throughout the Sengoku period, the Itō clan's most serious rival was the neighbouring Shimazu clan. The Shimazu clan had unified Satsuma Province and Ōsumi Province under its control, and began to clash with the Itō clan in 1570. The Itō clan was finally defeated by the Shimazu clan in 1578. After seeking help from then Shōgun Toyotomi Hideyoshi, the family's lands were restored in 1587 after his invasion of Kyūshū and subjugation of the Shimazu clan. By the Edo Era, the Itō clan regained its holdings, which came to be known as the Obi Domain. In the period after the Edo period, efforts were poured into quality education at the Shintoku Clan School in Obi. The school is where the Meiji period diplomat Marquis Komura Jutarō graduated from.

On January 1, 1950, the city was established through an amalgamation of Agata town, Aburatsu town, Obi town, and Togo village. On February 1, 1955, Futo village and Hosoda town joined the city district. The current Nichinan city was established on April 1, 1956, when it amalgamated with Sakatani village, Kahara village, and the Odotsu district. Since 1963, Nichinan has been the spring training location for the Hiroshima Carp baseball team.

In 1998, plans were made to extend the eastern Kyūshū expressway to come as far as Kitagō town and Nichinan. In 1999, a 12-meter wharf was completed at the eastern head of Aburatsu port. Aburatsu's increasing role as a harbor has made it a regular stopover for both domestic and foreign ships, and it is becoming an authentic international trading port. From 2001 to 2010, a general plan for the future of Nichinan was drawn up, with the simple theme of progressing Nichinan as, "a city that combines its fragrant history and culture with the sunshine and lush green mountains."

The group was, however, dissolved in May 2005 when the Kitagō Town Council vetoed the proposed merger bill despite the support for the merger by residents in both Kitagō and Nangō towns. The association was reconstituted on September 28, 2007, when merger supporters in both towns gained majorities on their respective town councils. On March 30, 2009, the three municipalities agreed to merge and become the new city of Nichinan.

Geography

Nichinan is on Japan's southernmost main island, Kyūshū.

Climate
Nichinan has a humid subtropical climate (Köppen climate classification Cfa) with hot, humid summers and cool winters.

Demographics
Per Japanese census data, the population of Nichinan in 2020 is 50,848 people. Nichinan has been conducting censuses since 1920.

Economy
Mandarin oranges, ponkan, sweet peas, green peppers, kumquats, and rice are the main agricultural products of Nichinan, a sector that employs 2,130 people. In addition, logging, particularly of obi cedar, takes place on 3,451 hectares of land. Fishing of tuna, bonito, and spiny lobster is another major industry.

Manufacturing is worth approximately ¥47.2 billion per year. Tourism draws over a million visitors each year.

Culture

Festivals and events
There are three major yearly festivals that occur in Nichinan:
 : This festival typically occurs between late March and early April when the approximately 1,000 cherry trees of Chikkō-en come into bloom.
: This festival at the port of Aburatsu features Japanese rowing and shihanmato (bow and arrow) competitions. Usually held the third weekend of July, there are also street stalls, a fireworks display, and tours of a Maritime Self-Defense Force vessel.
 : Held the third weekend of October in the former Obi Town, this Edo period festival features a procession of warriors, the traditional Nichinan Taihei dance, and princesses of the festival among the many public events.

Other events include spring and autumn training for the Hiroshima Carp baseball team, swimming and marathon events, and monthly morning markets held at Aburatsu port and in front of Nichinan City Hall.

Temples and shrines

: A shrine built in a cave on a cliff on the coast. According to myth, the main deity of the shrine is the father of the first emperor of Japan, Emperor Jinmu. Visitors pray at the shrine for success in matchmaking and safe childbirth. Below the cliff there is a huge rock shaped like a turtle. It is said that one's wishes will be granted if one can throw a stone into the depression in the center.

Points of interest
: The main gate of the castle was restored with 100-year-old Obi cedar in 1978. In the castle, the samurai's mansion, the storehouse, and the white-walled merchant building still remain. The castle town produced 51,000 koku of rice. Because of its many cultural and historic landmarks, it is called the "Little Kyoto" of Kyūshū. It is part of the Japan National Trust to preserve traditional architecture.
: A replica of the original palace reconstructed using 100-year-old Obi cedar.
: A restored canal district in Aburatsu known as the location for the movie Otoko wa tsurai yo. The canal is 900 meters long and was built at the beginning of the Edo period in 1685. The main purpose of its construction was to transport Obi cedar safely down to the port from inland logging areas.
: A mountain looking out over the port of Aburatsu. Locally, it is called the watchtower mountain, and in the Second World War it became an air raid watchtower. It was also used as a weather forecasting mountain by fleets of ships based at Aburatsu Port during the days of the Obi clan. The ships used the summit of the harbor as a marker and made their way into Aburatsu Port.

Other points of interest include:
:

Transport

Rail
JR Kyūshū provides rail transport through the city via the Nichinan Line.

Road
National Route 220 is the main transportation artery, passing through the center of the city.  National Routes 222 and 448 also provide automobile access through the city.

Educational facilities
There are seven kindergartens, 14 elementary schools, 11 junior high schools, and three high schools located within the city.

Sister cities
Naha, Okinawa Prefecture (Since April 24, 1969)
Portsmouth, New Hampshire, United States (Since September 5, 1985)
Inuyama, Aichi Prefecture (Since August 10, 2000)
Albany, Western Australia, Australia (Since November 17, 2010)

Media
 The Obi district of Nichinan was the location for the NHK television series "Wakaba" broadcast from September 2004 to March 2005.

References

 "Visiting Nichinan", pamphlet, Nichinan Tourism Association, 2007.

External links

 Nichinan City official website 
 Japanese National Tourist Organization 

Cities in Miyazaki Prefecture
Port settlements in Japan
Populated coastal places in Japan